Czechowice-Dziedzice railway station is a railway station in Czechowice-Dziedzice (Silesian Voivodeship), Poland. As of 2022, it is served by Koleje Śląskie (Silesian Voivodeship Railways) and PKP Intercity (EIP, InterCity, and TLK services).

Train services

The station is served by the following services:

Express Intercity Premium services (EIP) Warsaw - Katowice - Bielsko-Biała
Express Intercity Premium services (EIP) Gdynia - Warsaw - Katowice - Bielsko-Biała
Intercity services (IC) Warszawa - Częstochowa - Katowice - Bielsko-Biała
Intercity services (IC) Białystok - Warszawa - Częstochowa - Katowice - Bielsko-Biała
Intercity services (IC) Olsztyn - Warszawa - Skierniewice - Częstochowa - Katowice - Bielsko-Biała
Intercity services (IC) Ustka - Koszalin - Poznań - Wrocław - Opole - Bielsko-Biała
Intercity services (IC) Bydgoszcz - Poznań - Leszno - Wrocław - Opole - Rybnik - Bielsko-Biała - Zakopane

Regional Service (KŚ)  Katowice - Pszczyna - Czechowice-Dziedzice - Bielsko-Biała Gł. - Żywiec - Zwardoń
Regional services (KŚ)  Katowice - Pszczyna - Bielsko-Biała Gł - Żywiec - Nowy Targ - Zakopane
Regional services (KŚ)  Czechowice-Dziedzice - Chybie - Zebrzydowice - Cieszyn
Regional services (KŚ)  Rybnik - Żory - Czechowice-Dziedzice - Bielsko-Biała Gł - Żywiec

References 

Station article at  koleo.pl

Railway stations in Silesian Voivodeship
Railway stations served by Przewozy Regionalne InterRegio
Railway stations in Poland opened in 1855